HFY may refer to:

 Greenwood Municipal Airport, in Indiana, United States
 Harpers Ferry (Amtrak station), in West Virginia, United States
 Hi Fly (airline), a Portuguese airline